Street Rod 2 is a sequel to Street Rod developed by P.Z.Karen Co. Development Group and Logical Design Works, based on an original concept by Magic Partners and published by California Dreams for Amiga and MS-DOS. Street Rod 2 exclusively featured American Muscle Cars, specifically those from GM, Ford, and Chrysler. In December 2012, MK Consultancy, from the Netherlands, acquired the copyright ownership of the Street Rod games and re-released Street Rod 2, as well as the original game and an updated version, as freeware in 2014.

Changes
 The game is set in the summer of 1969, beginning on June 14, the first day of summer vacation.  (Street Rod was set in 1963).
 A largely different set of cars is available, most of them dating from the 1960s.
 There are now two variants of each car available to buy - an abused one (cheaper, with worn parts) and one in good condition. All cars can now only be bought once during the game.
 The differential, muffler and exhaust manifold can be replaced.
 The engine is shown in the engine bay and tuning takes place on the same screen.
 Car stickers are unavailable.
 Races are arranged outside of "Burgers Bungalow" instead of "Bob's Drive-In".
 There are two road tracks: Mulholland Drive, largely based on the Road race of Street Rod, and a completely new track, the Aqueduct, which resembles the aqueduct in the movie Grease.
 A car crash can result from hitting rocks, drains, barriers and bridge supports at any speed, or from passing through roadworks on the Mulholland Drive track at speeds greater than 50 mph. Travelling too far up a sloped wall on the aqueduct track at high speed results in the car flipping over.
 The King drives a 1969 Shelby GT500, with a supercharger that for Ford cars is unavailable as an upgrade within the game.
 Every Wednesday night the player can compete in a bracket racing drag competition called "Grudge Night". For a small entrance fee, the player is required to set a "breakout time" down the drag strip, after which the player must defeat all opponents without running faster than their breakout time.

Sequels
 Street Rod 3 is an unfinished, unofficial sequel to the series. It is being developed for Windows and Linux with the aim of recreating a game similar to Street Rod 2. It aims to add more cars and parts and also to transition the series from 2D to 3D graphics. The latest alpha release, version 0.4.4.1, is available under the GNU General Public License.

Reception
Mike Weksler reviewed the game for Computer Gaming World, and stated that "After several hours of reliving "hot rod" memories, the player may end up cruisin' down to his old hangouts on a Wednesday night. He'll most likely see a new generation of cars lined up at the local burger joint with hoods open, chrome glistening and terms like "four bolt main" and "camelback heads" floating in the air. The player may also be surprised to see fresh rubber streaking the pavement at the old drag strip, but if he doesn't, he can always come home and fire up Street Rod II: The Next Generation!"

Reviews
576 Kbyte
Compute!
Amazing Computer Magazine
Game Player's PC Strategy Guide

References

External links
 Official website
Street Rod 3: official website

1991 video games
Amiga games
California Dreams (publishing label) games
DOS games
Freeware games
Racing video games
Video game sequels
Video games developed in the United States